Dame Anne May Curwen, DBE (7 May 1889 – 13 September 1973) was National General Secretary of the YWCA of Great Britain.

Life
Anne Curwen was educated at Birkenhead High School and Harrogate College, attending Newnham College, Cambridge, where she gained a First in History. After teaching, she became the secretary of the Scottish Women's Hospitals in 1916. In 1919, she joined the YWCA as education secretary, then as National General Secretary from 1930–1949.

Following her retirement, she continued to sit on various public welfare committees, and had a particular interest in refugees. She was the British delegate to the United Nations High Commissioner for Refugees from 1954–58, and President of the British Council for Aid to Refugees from 1962 until her death in 1973.

References

1889 births
1973 deaths
Alumni of Newnham College, Cambridge
British humanitarians
Dames Commander of the Order of the British Empire
People from Birkenhead
People from Harrogate
Place of birth missing
Place of death missing
Nansen Refugee Award laureates